Pablo is a 2012 American documentary film about Cuban-American graphic designer Pablo Ferro.  It was directed by Richard Goldgewicht and narrated by Jeff Bridges.

Participants
The following people appeared in the documentary:

George Segal
Beau Bridges
Jon Voight
Andy Garcia
Anjelica Huston
Leonard Maltin
Stan Lee
Richard Benjamin

Release
The film premiered at the Rotterdam Film Festival in 2012, opened the Los Angeles Latino film festival the same year. It played the Rio de Janeiro International Film Festival on September 28, 2012.  It was then released on VOD on October 1, 2013 and DVD on November 5, 2013.

References

External links
 
 

American documentary films
2012 documentary films
2012 films
2010s English-language films
2010s American films